The Valdostana Pezzata Nera is an Italian breed of cattle from Valle d'Aosta region in north-western Italy. It is black-pied, with short horns. It is one of three regional breeds in the area, the others being the Valdostana Castana and the Valdostana Pezzata Rossa. Like them, it derives from inter-breeding of various local breeds and types of cattle. It appears to have been most influenced by the Swiss Fribourgeoise and Hérens breeds, which came into the Valle d'Aosta over the Great St. Bernard Pass. The Valdostana Pezzata Nera is a dual-purpose breed, raised mainly for milk, but also for meat. Management is normally transhumant: the cattle are stabled only in winter, and spend the summer months on the mountain pastures of the Alps.

History 

Like the other cattle breeds of the Valle d'Aosta, the Valdostana Castana and the Valdostana Pezzata Rossa, the Valdostana Pezzata Nera derives from inter-breeding of various local breeds and types of cattle. The most important influence on the development and morphology of the Pezzata Nera appears to have come from the Fribourgeoise (extinct since the 1970s) and Hérens breeds, which came into the area from Switzerland over the Great St. Bernard Pass. A breeders' association, the Associazione Nazionale Allevatori Bovini Razza Valdostana, was started in 1937, and a herd-book was established in 1985.

In 1946 it was thought that there were about  head.

The Valdostana Pezzata Nera is among the eleven breeds which together form the Fédération Européenne des Races Bovines de l'Arc Alpin, the others being: the Pinzgauer and Tiroler Grauvieh from Austria; the Abondance, Tarentaise and Vosgienne from France; the Hinterwälder and Vordelwälder from Germany; the Rendena from Italy; and the Hérens from Switzerland.

Characteristics 

The Valdostana Pezzata Nera is black-pied. The legs and belly are often white; the head is usually black, often with a white star. Unlike the Valdostana Castana, which has both red and black hair in its coat, the Pezzata Nera has only black hair in the black areas. The hooves, muzzle and mucosa are slate-black, and the horns short and black-tipped. The hooves are particularly hard. Management is transhumant: the cattle are stabled only in winter, and spend the summer months on the mountain pastures of the Alps, moving higher as the season progresses.

Use 

The Valdostana Pezzata Nera is raised both for milk and for meat. It is less productive that the Valdostana Pezzata Rossa, though hardier. This may be in part because the productive abilities of the breed have been reduced by cross-breeding with the Valdostana Castana to produce animals with good cow-fighting qualities.

Informal cow-fighting contests have been documented for more than 150 years. In the Valle d'Aosta, formal management of fights dates from 1958, when the Comité Regional des Batailles de Reines was formed. The contests have become an important socio-cultural event. Some twenty contests are held between March and October each year, culminating in a final battle and the crowning of the Reine or "queen". Success may significantly increase the market value of cows.

References

Cattle breeds originating in Italy